Rudolf Ernest Langer (8 March 1894 – 11 March 1968) was an American mathematician, known for the Langer correction and as a president of the Mathematical Association of America.

Career
Langer, the elder brother of William L. Langer, earned his PhD in 1922 from Harvard University under G. D. Birkhoff. He taught mathematics at Dartmouth College from 1922 to 1925. From 1927 to 1964 he was a mathematics professor at the University of Wisconsin-Madison and, from 1942 to 1952, the chair of the mathematics department. From 1956 to 1963 he was the director of the Army Mathematics Research Center; he was succeeded as director by J. Barkley Rosser. Langer's doctoral students include Homer Newell, Jr. and Henry Scheffé.

Works

References

External links

1894 births
1968 deaths
20th-century American mathematicians
Harvard University alumni
Presidents of the Mathematical Association of America
University of Wisconsin–Madison faculty